"I've Got Your Number" is a popular song composed by Cy Coleman with lyrics by Carolyn Leigh for the 1962 musical Little Me. It was originally introduced by Swen Swenson and Virginia Martin in the show.

American Theatre editor-in-chief Rob Weinert-Kendt wrote of the song in 2020, "It's got a sharp lyric by Carolyn Leigh and a wonderfully sneaky chart by Cy Coleman, a jazzman who happened to write for the musical theatre. The key to its success is in its marriage of those two elements; it's a song about essentially cornering someone, not with hostility or predation but with a certain teasing knowingness, as if to say, 'Drop the act, I'm onto you, we belong together,' and the song's harmonic structure keeps enacting a sort of unflustered, don't-change-the-subject move."

The song was performed frequently on TV variety shows of the 1960s, such as by Gwen Verdon and Danny Kaye on The Danny Kaye Show in 1964, Joey Heatherton on The Dean Martin Show in 1965, and Barbara Eden on The Andy Williams Show in 1966. It was also sung and danced by Dick Van Dyke and Mary Tyler Moore on "The Alan Brady Show Goes to Jail," a 1964 episode of The Dick Van Dyke Show.

Notable recordings
George Chakiris - a single release in 1962. 
Tommy Leonetti - a single release in 1962. 
Tony Bennett - included in his album I Wanna Be Around... (1963)
Vikki Carr - included in her album Color Her Great! (1963).
Peggy Lee - for her album In Love Again! 1964, 
Gene Barry - a single release in 1965. 
Marvin Gaye recorded in 1965 but not released until 2015 on the album Motown Unreleased 1965: Marvin Gaye.
Nancy Wilson - for her album From Broadway with Love (1966)
Ella Fitzgerald on her album Whisper Not
Jack Jones - on the American Hustle soundtrack (2013).

References

External Links
 Joey Heatherton performs "I've Got Your Number" on The Dean Martin Show
 Dick Van Dyke and Mary Tyler Moore perform "I've Got Your Number" on The Dick Van Dyke Show

Peggy Lee songs
Vikki Carr songs
1962 songs
Songs with music by Cy Coleman
Songs with lyrics by Carolyn Leigh